The 1993 European motorcycle Grand Prix was the eighth round of the 1993 Grand Prix motorcycle racing season. It took place on the 4 July 1993, at the Circuit de Catalunya.  This was the 500th race to contribute to the Grand Prix motorcycle racing championship.

500 cc race report
Yamaha allows Wayne Rainey to use a chassis from the ROC team.

Mick Doohan on pole. Rainey gets the start from Doohan and Kevin Schwantz.

Àlex Crivillé crashes out of 4th. Shinichi Itoh touches Doug Chandler’s back tire and crashes out, taking Chandler with him.

Rainey gets a gap to Doohan, then a gap to Schwantz. Rainey credits the wind more than the new frame: “The tailwind down the straight helped the Yamaha’s speed, but coming the other way I was able to use the wind to help get the bike to turn in.”

500 cc classification

250 cc classification

References

European motorcycle Grand Prix
European
European Motorcycle